Neoferdina is a genus of starfish in the family Goniasteridae. Members of the genus are found in the Indo-Pacific region, mostly between the Andaman Isles to the West and the Wake Isles, the Marshall Isles and Fiji to the east. The discovery of several species in the Seychelles widened the range considerably.

Species
The following species are included in the genus according to the World Register of Marine Species:

References

Goniasteridae